Vertigo is the debut solo album by American guitarist John 5, released on August 31, 2004. The album was also partly produced, engineered and mixed by Billy Sherwood, who also plays some lap steel and bass on the album. Other performers include Jay Schellen (drums), Kevin Savigar (co-writer, keys, programming, engineer, producer), "Bourbon" Bob Bartell (bass), Graham Ward (drums).

Track listing

Personnel
John 5 – guitars, bass guitar
Bob Bartell - bass guitar
Kevin Savigar - keyboards
Jay Schellen - drums
Graham Ward - drums

References

John 5 (guitarist) albums
2004 debut albums
Instrumental albums
Shrapnel Records albums